Alfortville is a commune in the Val-de-Marne department in the southeastern suburbs of Paris, France.

History
The commune of Alfortville was created on 1 April 1885 from part of the commune of Maisons-Alfort.

Transport
Alfortville is served by two stations on Paris RER line D: Maisons-Alfort – Alfortville and Le Vert de Maisons.

Alfortville is located at only 500 meters from the metro station Ecole vétérinaire de Maisons Alfort on Paris Métro Line 8

Population

Armenian community

The Armenian community of Alfortville is very significant. The Armenian Apostolic Church, located south of the city, is an important place for the Armenian community. There are streets named after Komitas Vartabed, Missak Manouchian, and the city of Yerevan. A roundabout has recently been named Place d'Achtarak after the Armenian city Ashtarak.

After military clashes in the Armenian-populated breakaway Nagorno-Karabakh region between Armenian and Azerbaijani troops resumed in 2020, the city council of Alfortville unanimously voted to support the recognition of its independence under its Armenian name of Artsakh Republic, making it the first French city to do so.

Education
Public schools in the commune include:
9 preschools/nurseries (maternelles) and an annex
6 elementary schools
Junior high schools: Collège Henri Barbusse, Collège Léon Blum, Collège Paul Langevin
Lycée Polyvalent Maximilien Perret

Private schools include:
 Ecole privée Saint-Mesrop (preschool, elementary)
 Ecole primaire-College Kevork A Arabian

Notable people
 
Marten Yorgantz (born 1946), Armenian singer, opened a restaurant here
Alexis Tomassian (born 1979), actor
Bendy Casimir (born 1980), mixed martial arts fighter
Jean-Eudes Maurice (born 1986), Haitian footballer
Jonathan Bamba (born 1996), footballer
Ihsan Sacko (born 1997), footballer

Twin towns – sister cities

Alfortville is twinned with:
 San Benedetto del Tronto, Italy (1989)
 Cantanhede, Portugal (2000)
 Oshakan, Armenia (2001)
 El Biar, Algeria (2011)

See also

Communes of the Val-de-Marne department

References

External links
Official website (in French)
The below of Alfortville (in French)

Armenian diaspora communities
Communes of Val-de-Marne